Zigua may refer to:

 Zigua people, ethnic group in Tanzania
 Zigua language, their language